The 2007 Campeonato Mineiro de Futebol do Módulo I was the 93rd season of Minas Gerais's top-flight professional football league. The season began on January 21 and ended on May 6. Atlético won the title for the 39th time.

Participating teams

League table

Final Tournament

Finals

First leg

Second leg

References 

Campeonato Mineiro seasons
Mineiro